Deep Creek is a locality in Kempsey Shire in New South Wales, Australia. It lies about 20 km west of Kempsey on the road to Armidale and 450 km northeast of Sydney.

References

Kempsey Shire
Localities in New South Wales